Kim Warwick (born 8 April 1952) is an Australian former professional male tennis player who competed on the ATP Tour from 1970–1987, reaching the singles final of the Australian Open in 1980. He defeated over 35 players ranked in the top ten including Guillermo Vilas, Raúl Ramírez, Vitas Gerulaitis, Jan Kodeš, Bob Lutz and Arthur Ashe. Warwick's career-high singles ranking was world No. 15, achieved in 1981. He won three singles titles and 26 doubles, including Australian Open 1978 (with Wojtek Fibak) and Australian Open 1980 and 1981, and Roland Garros 1985, and was also a runner-up in Australian Open 1986, all of them partnering fellow countryman Mark Edmondson. Partnering with Evonne Goolagong, he won the French Open 1972, defeating Françoise Dürr and Jean-Claude Barclay in the final 6–2, 6–4. Evonne and Kim were finalists in 1972 at Wimbledon against Rosie Casals and Ilie Năstase who won 6–4, 6–4.

Kim also was a member of the winning team of World Team Tennis in 1975 (Pittsburgh Triangles) and 1986 (San Antonio Racquets). Warwick also holds the record for the most match points missed in a losing effort, having held eleven chances to defeat eventual champion Adriano Panatta in the Rome Masters in 1976.

His best record is his streak of 21 consecutive Grand Slam appearances; it began in 1975, and did not end until 1980. His record would later be surpassed by Ivan Lendl and Stefan Edberg, who would run it out to 54 consecutive Grand Slam appearances.

Grand Slam finals

Singles: 1 (1 runner-up)

Doubles: 4 (4 titles)

Mixed doubles: 3 (2 titles, 1 runner-up)

Grand Slam performance timeline

Singles

Note: The Australian Open was held twice in 1977, in January and December.

Career finals

Singles (3 titles, 8 runners-up)

Doubles (26 titles, 26 runners-up)

References

External links

 
 
 
 

Australian male tennis players
Australian Open (tennis) champions
French Open champions
Tennis players from Sydney
1952 births
Living people
Grand Slam (tennis) champions in mixed doubles
Grand Slam (tennis) champions in men's doubles